Mami Donoshiro and Ai Sugiyama were the defending champions but they competed with different partners that year, Donoshiro with Yoriko Yamagishi and Sugiyama with Kyoko Nagatsuka.

Donoshiro and Yamagishi lost in the first round to Saori Obata and Nami Urabe.

Nagatsuka and Sugiyama lost in the final 6–7, 6–4, 7–6 against Miho Saeki and Yuka Yoshida.

Seeds
Champion seeds are indicated in bold text while text in italics indicates the round in which those seeds were eliminated.

 Kristine Radford /  Rennae Stubbs (first round)
 Kyoko Nagatsuka /  Ai Sugiyama (final)
 Patty Fendick /  Marianne Werdel-Witmeyer (semifinals)
 Janette Husárová /  Rachel McQuillan (semifinals)

Draw

External links
 1995 Japan Open Tennis Championships Women's Doubles Draw
 Main draw (WTA)

Doubles